Battle of Newbury may refer to:

First Battle of Newbury, 20 September 1643
Second Battle of Newbury, 27 October 1644
Third Battle of Newbury, January--April 1996, a large anti-road protest over the building of the Newbury Bypass.